Compsoctena taprobana is a moth in the Eriocottidae family. It was described by Walsingham in 1887. It is found in Sri Lanka.

References

Moths described in 1887
Compsoctena
Moths of Sri Lanka